Little Mother (also known as Woman of the Year) is a 1973 drama, romance, cult film directed by Radley Metzger and starring Christiane Krüger, Siegfried Rauch and Ivan Desny. The story was loosely modelled on that of Evita Peron in Argentina. It was a co-production between the United States, West Germany and Yugoslavia.

Plot
A woman in a South American country rises from being a struggling actress to the wife of the President, who she plans to overthrow and make herself dictator.

Cast

 Siegfried Rauch as Colonel Pinares 
 Christiane Krüger as Marina Pinares 
 Ivan Desny as Colonel Umberia 
 Mark Damon as Riano 
 Anton Diffring as The Cardinal 
 Elga Sorbas as Annette

Notes
According to one film reviewer, Radley Metzger's films, including those made during the Golden Age of Porn (1969–1984), are noted for their "lavish design, witty screenplays, and a penchant for the unusual camera angle". Another reviewer noted that his films were "highly artistic — and often cerebral ... and often featured gorgeous cinematography". Film and audio works by Metzger have been added to the permanent collection of the Museum of Modern Art (MoMA) in New York City.

See also
 List of American films of 1973

References

External links
 Little Mother at  MUBI (related to The Criterion Collection)
 

American drama films
Cultural depictions of Eva Perón
English-language German films
English-language Yugoslav films
Films about actors
Films about dictators
Films directed by Radley Metzger
Films set in South America
German drama films
1973 films
1973 drama films
1970s exploitation films
West German films
Yugoslav drama films
Films à clef
1970s English-language films
1970s American films
1970s German films